Robert Cullen, Lord Cullen FRSE (22 September 1742 – 28 November 1810) was a Scottish judge. Friends knew him as Bob Cullen. He played a key role, along with his father William Cullen, in obtaining a royal charter for the Philosophical Society of Edinburgh, resulting in the formation of the Royal Society of Edinburgh in 1783.

Life

Born on 22 September 1742, in Hamilton, Scotland, the son of Anne Johnstone (d.1786) and eminent physician and chemist William Cullen, the family moved to live in the old mint in Edinburgh when his father received a position at the university. His brother was the physician Henry Cullen. The family lived at South Grays Close on the Canongate, home of the old Scottish Mint.

Robert was educated at the High School and then the University of Edinburgh. He was admitted to the Faculty of Advocates in 1764, and served as a Senator of the College of Justice (1796-9), and as Lord of Justiciary (1799–1810). His position as Senator followed the death of James Erskine, Lord Alva.

In 1783 he was a joint founder of the Royal Society of Edinburgh.

He died on 28 November 1810 and was buried alongside his father in Kirknewton churchyard, south-west of Edinburgh.

Family

He was married to Mary Russell who died in 1818. They had no children.

References

1742 births
1810 deaths
18th-century Scottish people
19th-century Scottish people
Senators of the College of Justice
Members of the Philosophical Society of Edinburgh
Founder Fellows of the Royal Society of Edinburgh
Lawyers from Edinburgh
Alumni of the University of Edinburgh
Cullen